Elmer Merrill may refer to:
 Elmer Drew Merrill (1876–1956), American botanist
 Elmer Truesdell Merrill (1860–1936), American Latin scholar